The  superyacht Elysian was launched by Lürssen at their Rendsburg shipyard. The yacht’s exterior is the design work of Espen Øino. Reymond Langton Design was selected by the owner to create the custom interior.

Design 
The hull is built out of steel while the superstructure is made out of aluminium with teak laid decks. The yacht is Lloyd's registered, issued by Cayman Islands.

Engines 
Elysian is powered by twin MTU 12V4000M63 diesel engines, with a total power output 4022 hp.

See also
 List of motor yachts by length
 List of yachts built by Lürssen

References

2014 ships
Motor yachts
Ships built in Germany